Raoul Courbin (born 18 August 1926) was a French footballer. He competed in the men's tournament at the 1948 Summer Olympics.

He scored a goal against India at the 1948 Olympics, in their 2–1 win, which was independent India's first official match.

References

External links

1926 births
Possibly living people
French footballers
Olympic footballers of France
Footballers at the 1948 Summer Olympics
Association football forwards